CBR may refer to:

Business and organizations
 Central Bank of Russia
 Central Board of Revenue, the Pakistan department for revenue collection
 CBR, formerly the New York Stock Exchange symbol for Ciber
 Center for Bio-Ethical Reform, an anti-abortion non-profit organization
 Centre for Blood Research at the University of British Columbia
 CBR (Cimenteries et Briqueteries Réunies), now HeidelbergCement
 Championship Bull Riding, a rodeo organization in Texas, USA

Comics
 .cbr, a file extension for comic book archive files
 Comic Book Resources, a news and discussion website

Radio
 CBR (AM), a radio station in Calgary, Alberta, Canada
 CBR-FM, a radio station in Calgary, Alberta, Canada
 CBR, former call sign of radio station CBU in Vancouver, British Columbia, Canada

Science, medicine, and engineering
 California bearing ratio, a strength measurement of material under a paved area
 Cannabinoid receptor, a type of cell membrane receptor
 Case-based reasoning, an artificial intelligence technique
 Central benzodiazepine receptor, the receptor for benzodiazepines in the central nervous system
 Crude birth rate, a measure of live births
 Community-based rehabilitation, programs for the disabled
 Cosmic background radiation
 Critical body residue, the measure of toxicity in tissue residue

Telecommunications
 Constant bitrate, in telecommunication, sound and music formats
 Constraint-based routing, in telecommunication and computer networks
 Content-based routing or router, a type of application-oriented networking

Transport
 Canberra Airport, IATA airport code CBR
 Canberra MRT station, Australia
 Cleburne (Amtrak station), Texas, USA
 Honda CBR series, a line of sports motorbikes
 Chesapeake Beach Railway, a former railroad from Washington, D.C. to Maryland, USA
 Cooksbridge railway station, in Sussex, England

Other uses
 Corinne Bailey Rae (born 1979), British singer
 Cost-benefit ratio, in economics
 Captive bead ring, a type of body piercing jewelry
 Chesapeake Bay Retriever, a dog breed
 Crash Bandicoot Racing, Japanese name for the Crash Team Racing video game
 Carpathian Biosphere Reserve, a nature reserve in eastern Europe

See also 
 Chemical, biological, radiological, and nuclear (CBRN), a category of hazardous incidents or weapons